James Hillhouse High School is a four-year comprehensive public high school in New Haven, Connecticut. It serves grades 9–12. Formerly New Haven High School, it is the oldest public high school in New Haven, and is part of the New Haven Public Schools.

History 
Established in 1859 as New Haven High School, Hillhouse High School is New Haven's oldest public high school. Originally located on Orange Street, it adopted its nickname, "The Academics", in acknowledgment of its close association with Yale University.

In 1863, the school was moved to a building at Orange and Wall Streets, which was replaced in 1871 by a new school.

The school is named in honor of James Hillhouse of New Haven, who represented Connecticut in the U.S. Congress  in the early years of the United States' existence as a nation, serving as both a Representative and a Senator.

For many years, Hillhouse served not only New Haven but also suburban towns around the city that did not have high schools of their own. Its peak enrollment was nearly 5,000 students, when the school had to conduct double sessions to accommodate the large enrollment.

Statistics 
The school includes grades 9 through 12 and enrolls about 979 students.

Athletics 
Hillhouse became involved in athletic competition as early as 1866, when some boys formed a club to play a sport that is described as having "resembled rugby and soccer." By 1884, students were participating in several sports, including modern football, which had been invented by Walter Camp of New Haven. Team competition in baseball, tennis, ice hockey, indoor polo and yacht racing also had been established around this time. Basketball was introduced around the beginning of the 20th century.

Hillhouse football teams have won 17 state championships, ranking the school third in the state for football championships. The boys’ and girls’ basketball teams have a combined total 33 state championships. 24 for the boys and 9 for the girls. The boys’ and girls’ track teams also have more than 25 state championships between them. The Academics also have won state championships in baseball, swimming, ice hockey and tennis.

In 1999, a grant was provided by the Connecticut Association of Schools to construct a fieldhouse for sports.  Construction was finished in 2002, and it was named the New Haven Athletic Center, later to become the Floyd Little Athletic Center in 2011. The  Athletic Center houses events for basketball, indoor track, and tennis. It has a capacity of 3,500 seats.

In 2016, the school inaugurated its brand new Bowen field (football field) after the discovery of elevated levels of toxic PCBs (Polychlorinated biphenyls) in bleacher caulking joints and exterior locker room paint in 2013 

The school's official colors are blue and white and the mascot is a bulldog due to the school's early close association with Yale University. The school competes in the Hammonasset Division of the Southern Connecticut Conference and the sports offered are:

Fall
Football
Boys' Soccer (co-op with Hill Regional Career High School)
Girls' Soccer (co-op with Wilbur Cross High School)
Cross Country
Cheerleading
Volleyball

Winter
Boys' Basketball
Girls' Basketball
Indoor Track

Spring
Baseball
Softball
Golf
Outdoor Track

- The school is known for having one of the best Basketball teams in the state winning the state championship many years:

Boys Basketball State Championships:

1924, 1926, 1932, 1937, 1945, 1946, 1947, 1948, 1952, 1955, 1963, 1964, 1965, 1969, 1970, 1978, 1984, 1986, 1990, 2006, 2007, 2013, 2016, 2017.

Girls Basketball State Championships:

1981, 1982, 1998, 2000, 2004, 2005, 2009, 2010, 2011.

- The football team plays Wilbur Cross High School every year on Thanksgiving in the Elm City Bowl.

Notable alumni 

Bob Barthelson, professional baseball pitcher
Albie Booth, football player
Ernest Borgnine, actor
Raymond C. Bowen, president of LaGuardia Community College
Joseph Payne Brennan, New Haven poet, author, World War II veteran
John C. Daniels, mayor of New Haven
Chad Dawson, professional boxer
Pete Falsey, MLB player
Harrison Fitch, UConn basketball player
Robert Giaimo, U.S. Congressman
Louis Harris, pollster
John Huggins, leader in the Black Panthers
Levi Jackson, first African-American to be captain of the football team at Yale University
Joan R. Kemler, the first woman to serve as Connecticut State Treasurer (1986–87)
Richard C. Lee, mayor of New Haven
Floyd Little, former 5x Pro Bowl and Pro Football Hall of Fame running back for the Denver Broncos
Paul McCracken, NBA and Maccabi Tel Aviv basketball player
Kevin McKeown, mayor of Santa Monica, California
Constance Baker Motley, civil rights activist and politician
Maurice Podoloff, first president of the National Basketball Association
Judith Schiff, chief research archivist, Yale University
Artie Shaw, jazz clarinetist and big band leader
Vincent Scully, architectural historian and University of Miami and Yale University professor
William Starkweather, artist
Raymond St. Jacques, actor
Dick Tettelbach, former MLB player, New York Yankees and Washington Senators
George Weiss, MLB executive
Terrell Wilks, sprinter and All American at the University of Florida

References

External links 

 

Schools in New Haven, Connecticut
Educational institutions established in 1859
Public high schools in Connecticut
1859 establishments in Connecticut